East Chevington is a parish in Northumberland, England, and was a village until it disappeared in the 1900s.

In 2001, the parish had a population of 3,192, increasing to 3,951 at the 2011 Census.

History 
The site of the village was inhabited and the surrounding area used for agriculture at least as far back as the medieval period.  Crop marks visible from the air suggest that the site may have been inhabited as far back as Roman times, however.  An ordnance survey map from 1866 shows that there was a blacksmith's workshop in the village at that time.  During World War II , various defences were established near the village.

Chevington drift 
There is a memorial stone on the site of the old drift entrance.  The plaque is inscribed

See also 

Drift mining
List of civil parishes in Northumberland
Northumberland Wildlife Trust

References

External links 
 The History of East Chevington

Civil parishes in Northumberland